Maharashtra's Best Dancer is the Marathi-language version of the reality television programme India's Best Dancer and the show aired on Sony Marathi. Actress Pooja Sawant and Choreographer Dharmesh Yelande are the Judges and the hosts are Sankarshan Karhade and Namrata Sambherao. Prathamesh Mane is the winner of season 1.

Concept 
Maharashtra's Best Dancer will showcase the people of some of the best dancing talent, who with their solo performances, will compete to win the show. In the Grand Premiere, the judges announced the Top 14 contestants who will have a respective mentor in the journey ahead. Week-on-week these 14 contestants will have to impress the judges and audience alike to move closer to winning the most coveted title of Maharashtra's Best Dancer.

Top 13 contestants

Guests

Judges & Hosts 
Judges of Maharashtra's best dancer are:
 Dharmesh Yelande
 Pooja Sawant

Hosts of Maharashtra's best dancer are:
 Sankarshan Karhade
 Namrata Sambherao

References

External links 
 Maharashtra's Best Dancer at Sony LIV

Dance competition television shows
Indian reality television series
2020 Indian television series debuts
Sony Marathi original programming
2021 Indian television series endings
Marathi-language television shows
India's Best Dancer